A list of cities, towns and villages in Fars Province of southern Iran:

Alphabetical
Cities are in bold text; all others are villages.

A
Ab Anar | Ab Anbar-e Jahad Ashayiri | Ab Anjir | Ab Anjir | Ab Araq | Ab Asemani | Ab Bada | Ab Badamu | Ab Band | Ab Barik Industrial Estate | Ab Barik | Ab Bid | Ab Bidak | Ab Bid-e Dalun | Ab Bid-e Doshman Ziari | Ab Bid-e Sar Anjeli | Ab Chenaran | Ab Chenaru | Ab Dozduiyeh | Ab Garm | Ab Garm | Ab Garm-e Olya | Ab Gui | Ab Hoseyn | Ab Javan | Ab Kabak | Ab Kaneh | Ab Katan | Ab Konaru | Ab Mahi | Ab Mik | Ab Morvarid | Ab Narak | Ab Pakhshan | Ab Pardeh | Ab Qalat | Ab Qorqoru | Ab Sefid | Ab Sheykh | Ab Shib | Ab Shirin | Ab Shirin | Ab Soru | Ab Surakh | Ab Zalu | Ab Zangi | Abad Shahpur | Abadeh | Abadeh Abgarm | Abadeh Tashk | Abadeh | Abadeh | Abali | Abbad | Abbasabad | Abbasabad | Abbasabad | Abbasabad | Abbasabad | Abbasabad | Abbasabad | Abbasabad | Abbasabad | Abbasabad | Abbasabad-e Eskandari | Abbasabad-e Gazak | Abdol Karimi | Abdollahabad | Abdollahi-ye Olya | Abdollahi-ye Sofla | Abdui | Abdun | Ab-e Gandu | Ab-e Garm | Ab-e Narak | Ab-e Now-e Khani Yek | Abedabad | Abgarm | Abgarm | Abgarm | Abgarm-e Pir Sohabi | Abgasht-e Madui | Abgol | Abkureh | Abnow | Abraheh | Absard | Abshur | Abtut | Abu Ali | Abu Askar | Abu Hana | Abu Nasr | Abu ol Hayat | Abu ol Mehdi | Abu ol Verdi | Abu Tarbeh | Abuzarabad | Abyan | Ades Kari-ye Olya | Aghan | Aghoseh | Ahangari | Ahel | Ahla Kuh | Ahmad Mahmudi | Ahmadabad Deris | Ahmadabad | Ahmadabad | Ahmadabad | Ahmadabad | Ahmadabad | Ahmadabad | Ahmadabad | Ahmadabad | Ahmadabad | Ahmadabad | Ahmadabad | Ahmadabad-e Kateh | Ahmadabad-e Korbal | Ahmadabad-e Pol Abgineh | Ahmadun | Akbarabad | Akbarabad | Akbarabad | Akbarabad | Akbarabad | Akbarabad-e Hashivar | Akbarabad-e Sardasht | Akbari | Ala ol Dowleh | Alamabad | Alamarvdasht | Alamdan-e Olya | Alamdan-e Sofla | Ali Mohseni | Ali Resideh | Ali Shahi | Aliabad | Aliabad | Aliabad | Aliabad | Aliabad | Aliabad | Aliabad | Aliabad | Aliabad | Aliabad | Aliabad | Aliabad | Aliabad | Aliabad | Aliabad | Aliabad | Aliabad | Aliabad | Aliabad | Aliabad | Aliabad-e Abgarm | Aliabad-e Bejuyeh | Aliabad-e Dutu | Aliabad-e Jowhari | Aliabad-e Khvoshablu | Aliabad-e Malek | Aliabad-e Musehli | Aliabad-e Nasir Khani | Aliabad-e Olya | Aliabad-e Owkoshi | Aliabad-e Puzeh Rowghan Cheraghi | Aliabad-e Qarchi | Aliabad-e Qoroq | Aliabad-e Salar | Aliabad-e Sar Tang | Aliabad-e Sar Tol | Aliabad-e Seh Tolan | Aliabad-e Shams | Aliabad-e Shur | Aliabad-e Sofla | Aliabad-e Sorkhak | Aliabad-e Zahd Mahmud | Allah Morad Khani | Allahabad | Aminabad | Amir Ayyub | Amir Hajjilu | Amir Salar-e Olya | Amir Salari | Amirabad Kaftar | Amirabad | Amirabad | Amirabad-e Karbalayi Khosrow | Amirabad-e Panjahopanj | Amirabad-e Panjahoshesh | Amirabad-e Sili Zardi | Amlak | Amrabad | Amrabad | Amui | Amui | Anar Mehr | Anarak | Anarak | Anarestan | Anda | Andar | Angakban | Angareh | Anjirak | Anjirband | Anjireh | Anjireh | Anjireh | Anjireh-ye Gowkhast | Anna | Aq Cheshmeh | Aq Jalu | Aqajan-e Tavakkol | Arab Abdi | Arab Chegini | Arab-e Gavmishi | Arabuyeh | Arad | Arad | Arbabi-ye Olya | Arbabi-ye Sofla | Ardakan | Ardali | Ardeshiri-ye Bala | Ardeshiri-ye Sofla | Ardeshiri-ye Vosta | Arg | Arjuyeh | Arsanjan | Arudan-e Olya | Arudan-e Sofla | Arusak | Asadabad | Asadabad | Asadabad-e Lateh Kuh | Asefabad | Aseman Gerd | Asemi | Asfal | Asgarabad | Ashjerd | Ashkam Shur | Ashna | Asiab-e Kereshki | Asir | Aspas | Ataabad | Atabak | Atabakhsh-e Ghani | Avak-e Pain | Avanjan | Aveh | Aviz | Ayas Jan | Ayaz Galu | Ayazabad | Ayur | Azad Khani | Azarbeyglu | Azizabad |

B
Bab Anar | Bab Ayur | Baba Arab | Baba Gurin | Baba Kamal | Baba Khani | Baba Kuhak | Baba Meydan-e Olya | Baba Meydan-e Sofla | Baba Meydan-e Zirrah | Baba Monir | Baba Salari | Baba Salehi | Babagushi | Babai | Babolbam | Bachan | Badaki | Badaki | Badamak | Badameh | Badamu | Badbar | Badenjan | Bagdaneh | Bagh Avaz | Bagh Dasht | Bagh Safa | Bagh | Bagh | Baghan | Baghan | Baghat-e Qaraval | Baghchaleh | Bagh-e Anarak | Bagh-e Bala | Bagh-e Barus | Bagh-e Doktor Mansur Zahadi | Bagh-e Gar | Bagh-e Hajji Abdol | Bagh-e Kabir | Bagh-e Kazem Filvandi | Bagh-e Khoshrow | Bagh-e Khuni | Bagh-e Manuchehr Kamjunia | Bagh-e Marbut | Bagh-e Masali Nezhad | Bagh-e Masli Nezhad | Bagh-e Molla | Bagh-e Najafabad | Bagh-e Naser Zarghami | Bagh-e Now | Bagh-e Shad | Bagh-e Tir-e Hajjiabad | Baghestan | Baghestan-e Abu ol Hayat | Baghestan-e Kandehi | Bahadorabad | Bahadoran | Bahareh | Bahlu | Bahman | Bahmani | Bahmani | Bahmani | Bahr Ghan | Bahramabad | Bahramabad | Bahramabad | Bajgah | Bajgah | Bajki | Bakaldun-e Gholam Shah | Bakan | Bakar-e Olya | Bakar-e Sofla | Baker | Bakhsh Zirdu | Bakhtajerd | Bakhtiaruyeh | Bakian | Bakur | Bal Bali | Bal Mini | Bala Deh | Bala Kuh | Bala Shahr | Baladeh | Balangan-e Olya | Baleqlu | Baliu | Balkareh | Balmangan | Baluchi | Balumeh | Balut Geru | Balut Jahan | Balutabad | Balutak | Balut-e Asadi | Balyan | Bam Anguri | Bam Badami | Bam-e Gurinja | Banaf | Banak | Banaruiyeh | Banavan | Band Barik | Band Bast-e Bala | Band Bast-e Pain | Band Didegan | Band-e Amir | Band-e Bast | Band-e Now | Baneh Khafrak | Baneh Yekkeh | Banesh | Bani Yekkeh | Banian | Bankastan | Bankuy-e Ashayir Dahaneh Qalehha | Bankuy-e Ashayir Kol Chah | Banuj | Baqerabad | Baqerabad | Baqerabad | Baqerabad | Bar Aftab-e Zirdu | Bar Bid-e Mohammad Qoli | Bar Cheshmeh | Barab | Barah Ruz | Barak | Baramshad | Bard Kharan | Bard Kuh | Bard Qaleh | Bard Tork | Bard Zard | Bardabad | Bardaleh | Bard-e Now | Bardeh Kuyeh | Bardej | Barezabad | Barg-e Tut | Barkeh Abi | Barm Shur-e Olya | Barm Shur-e Sofla | Barmah | Barm-e Jamal | Barm-e Shur | Barm-e Siah | Barreh | Barus | Bas Kutuku | Baseri Aqajan | Baseri Hadi | Bashgan | Bashirabad | Basiran | Bast Bani | Bast Nari | Bastarm-e Cheshmeh Anjir | Bastarm-e Olya | Bastarm-e Otaqi | Bast-e Durah | Bast-e Kheyrabad | Batun | Bavan-e Olya | Bavan-e Sofla | Bavan-e Vosta | Bavarian | Bavarkan | Bayegan | Bayjan | Baz Bachcheh | Bazam-e Ahuchar | Bazm | Bazmak-e Olya | Bazmak-e Sofla | Bazrangan | Behesht Makan | Beheshtabad | Behjan | Behrestan | Behruzabad-e Sofla | Behuyeh | Bekahdan | Belhezar-e Bala | Belhezar-e Pain | Beneger | Benow | Benow | Benugir | Berak | Berayjan | Bereshneh | Bergaki | Berikhun | Beriskan | Beriz | Berkeh | Berkeh-ye Mah Banu | Berkeh-ye Mollai | Berkeh-ye Sefid | Beryanak | Beryu | Besharjan | Beshneh | Beyan | Beyk Inanlu | Beyram | Beytollahi | Beyza | Bezin | Bi Kanda | Biadeh | Bibi Nazkhatun | Bibimohlat | Bid Gerd | Bid Gol | Bid Harakat | Bid Karz | Bid Khal | Bid Mohammadi | Bid Qatar-e Bon Rud | Bid Shahr | Bid Shahrak | Bid Zard | Bid Zard | Bid Zard-e Olya | Bid Zard-e Sofla | Bid Zardi | Bidak | Bidak | Bidal Bacheh | Bid-e Zard | Bidkan | Bigherd | Bikehdan | Bikhak-e Joruq | Bikheh Deraz | Bikhuyeh | Bikuh | Bimi-ye Sofla | Bir | Bisheh Zard | Bisheh Zard | Bisotun-e Bon Rud | Bizdan | Bizjan-e Olya | Bizjan-e Sofla | Bodir | Bokat | Bolaghi | Bolandu | Bolbolak | Boleh Dan | Bolghan | Bon Band | Bon Darreh | Bon Dasht | Bon Jir | Bon Kuyeh | Bon Rud | Bon Zard | Bonab | Bonduiyeh | Boneh Darvazeh | Boneh Raz | Boneh Sur | Boneh-ye Abed | Boneh-ye Dari | Boneh-ye Mirza Ali Akbar | Boneh-ye Seyyed Mohammad Reza | Bonkuy-e Amiri | Bonkuy-e Ashayir Miraki | Bonkuy-e Ashayir Owlad Sani | Bonkuy-e Ashayir Shaban Kareh | Bonkuy-e Bagdali | Bonkuy-e Chahar Boneh Cheh | Bonkuy-e Dangzalu | Bonkuy-e Gholam Hoseynlu | Bonkuy-e Hasanlu | Bonkuy-e Hemmatlu | Bonkuy-e Heydari | Bonkuy-e Heydarlu | Bonkuy-e Jafari | Bonkuy-e Kazemi | Bonkuy-e Khalili | Bonkuy-e Mokhtari | Bonkuy-e Nosrati | Bonkuy-e Qarbani | Bonkuy-e Rahimi | Bonkuy-e Rajabi | Bonkuy-e Sadeqi | Bonkuy-e Shobani | Bonkuy-e Sohrab Khanlu | Bonkuy-e Soleymani | Borazjan | Borgan | Borj Sukhteh-ye Olya | Borj Sukhteh-ye Sofla | Borj-e Delbar | Borj-e Khankaram | Borj-e Seyfollah | Borj-e Seyyed | Boruiyeh | Bosar Jan | Bostaneh | Bozmiyan | Buanak | Buraki | Buraki | Buraki-ye Olya | Buraki-ye Sofla | Burenjan | Burzakan | Bushkan Water Station | Bushkan-e Deylami | Bushkan-e Mirzai | Buzanjan-e Olya | Buzanjan-e Sofla | Buzar

C
Chaghan | Chah Ali | Chah Anjir | Chah Anjir | Chah Anjir | Chah Anjir-e Barmshur | Chah Anjir-e Bid Karz | Chah Anjir-e Olya | Chah Anjir-e Olya | Chah Anjir-e Sofla | Chah Bid | Chah Bidu | Chah Chah | Chah Chenar | Chah Darva | Chah Deraz | Chah Dimeh | Chah Gach-e Sofla | Chah Gani | Chah Gaz | Chah Gazi | Chah Gazi | Chah Guraki | Chah Kabkan | Chah Kandar | Chah Kandeh | Chah Kur | Chah Mahi | Chah Mahki | Chah Mish | Chah Muri | Chah Nahr | Chah Now-ye Deh Sheykh | Chah Rigi | Chah Sabz | Chah Sabz-e Bahman Khani | Chah Sargahi | Chah Sefid | Chah Sharaf | Chah Sheykh | Chah Shirin | Chah Shuli | Chah Shur | Chah Shur | Chah Shur | Chah Shurak | Chah Shur-e Olya | Chah Shur-e Sofla | Chah Sorkh | Chah Sorkh | Chah Sorkhi | Chah Talkh | Chah Tiz | Chah Tus | Chah Tut | Chah Varz | Chah Zal | Chah Zebar | Chahab | Chahaki | Chahar Bid-e Sartang | Chahar Bisheh | Chahar Borj | Chahar Deh | Chahar Mur | Chahar Qash | Chahar Qash-e Talkhab | Chahar Qashi | Chahar Qollat | Chahar Rah-e Zirrah | Chahar Taq | Chahar Taq | Chahar Taq | Chahar Taq | Chahar Taq | Chahar Taq | Chah-e Agah | Chah-e Amiq | Chah-e Anjir | Chah-e Baneh | Chah-e Chavarz | Chah-e Darbas | Chah-e Doktor | Chah-e Gandeh | Chah-e Gol | Chah-e Kalaleh | Chah-e Khaluha | Chah-e Mari | Chah-e Meskeh | Chah-e Milak | Chah-e Mohammad Hajji | Chah-e Nasru | Chah-e Pahn | Chah-e Pahn | Chah-e Pahn | Chah-e Ramezan | Chah-e Savar Agha | Chah-e Shakari | Chah-e Sharif Khani | Chah-e Shib | Chah-e Shomareh-ye Seh | Chah-e Sorkh | Chah-e Vagazari-ye Shomareh-ye Chahar | Chah-e Vagazari-ye Shomareh-ye Do | Chah-e Vagazari-ye Shomareh-ye Haft | Chah-e Vagazari-ye Shomareh-ye Hasht | Chah-e Vagazari-ye Shomareh-ye Panj | Chah-e Vagazari-ye Shomareh-ye Seh | Chah-e Vagazari-ye Shomareh-ye Shesht | Chah-e Vagazari-ye Shomareh-ye Yek | Chah-e Zendegani | Chahu | Chak Chak | Chak-e Nar | Chal Anjaki | Cham Borreh | Cham Emamzadeh | Cham Espid | Cham Gol | Cham Kangari | Cham Shel | Cham Zeytun | Cham Zeytun-e Eslamabad | Chaman Bid | Chaman-e Bahram | Chaman-e Morvarid | Chamani | Cham-e Chenar | Cham-e Gaz | Cham-e Sohrab Khani | Cham-e Zir | Chamkur | Charchareh | Chasht Khvor | Chedruyeh | Chehel Cheshmeh | Chehel Cheshmeh-ye Koruni | Chek Cheg | Chekak | Chek-e Golabi | Chenar Barg | Chenar Faryab | Chenar Mishavan | Chenar Pakaneh | Chenar Sukhteh | Chenar Sukhteh | Chenar Sukhteh | Chenar Zahedan | Chenar | Chenar | Chenar | Chenar | Chenarak | Chenaran | Chenar-e Sukhteh | Chenaru | Chenaruiyeh | Cheramakan | Cherrun | Cheshivan | Cheshmeh Ab Gol | Cheshmeh Anjir | Cheshmeh Baklu | Cheshmeh Bardi | Cheshmeh Bari | Cheshmeh Boluqu | Cheshmeh Chahi | Cheshmeh Darreh | Cheshmeh Dozdan | Cheshmeh Gol | Cheshmeh Konari | Cheshmeh Qoroq-e Chin | Cheshmeh Rana | Cheshmeh Sardu | Cheshmeh Sefid | Cheshmeh Sefid | Cheshmeh Seyyed Safari | Cheshmeh Shirin | Cheshmeh Shirin | Cheshmeh Sib Coffee Company | Cheshmeh Talkhu | Cheshmeh Zeytun | Cheshmeh-ye Ab Gorazi | Cheshmeh-ye Abgarm | Cheshmeh-ye Sang Band | Cheshmeh-ye Sang Band | Cheshmeh-ye Shirin | Cheshmeh-ye Takht | Cheshmeh-ye Valiabad Vali | Chikan | Chini Integrated Quarry | Chir | Chir | Chiti | Chokhuha | Chur Ab Qalandari | City Industrial Complex

D
Dadenjan | Dadin-e Olya | Dadin-e Sofla | Dafar | Dahleh | Dalin | Dalkhan | Dalv-e Nazar | Dam Qanat-e Jowngan | Damaneh | Damcheh | Damdari Hay-e Kazerun | Damkan | Damparuri-ye Khezrehl Run | Damqanat | Dangan | Dangez | Danian | Danicheh Kheyr | Daq Ahu | Dar Faraghat Agricultural Institute | Dar ol Mizan | Darab | Darakuyeh | Daranganeh | Daravay Diyu | Darb Qaleh | Darbandan | Darbas | Darb-e Emamzadeh | Darbidu | Dareh | Darenjan | Darenjan-e Lor | Darian | Darju | Darnian | Darreh Ahaki | Darreh Asali | Darreh Bad | Darreh Badu | Darreh Bakhtan | Darreh Garm | Darreh Gol | Darreh Hamyaneh-ye Olya | Darreh Hamyaneh-ye Sofla | Darreh Mal | Darreh Maru | Darreh Marun | Darreh Moradi | Darreh Murdi | Darreh Palangi | Darreh Sefid | Darreh Sefid | Darreh Shur | Darreh Shur-e Bala | Darreh Susan | Darreh-ye Ali Khani | Darreh-ye Salb | Darreh-ye Talkh Rashek | Darva | Darvishabad | Darvishan | Darz | Dasht Bal | Dasht Konar | Dasht | Dashtak | Dashtak | Dashtak-e Olya | Dasht-e Ahmad | Dasht-e Ali | Dasht-e Arzhan | Dasht-e Asad | Dasht-e Azadegan | Dasht-e Barm | Dasht-e Beyza | Dasht-e Dal | Dasht-e Dera Balverdi | Dasht-e Dideh Ban | Dasht-e Gur | Dasht-e Gurki | Dasht-e Hasani-ye Yek | Dasht-e Hey Bu | Dasht-e Kalusi | Dasht-e Kangari | Dasht-e Kangari | Dasht-e Karim | Dasht-e Kenar | Dasht-e Khowrdeh | Dasht-e Lar | Dasht-e Mak | Dasht-e Mil-e Olya | Dasht-e Mil-e Sofla | Dasht-e Murd | Dasht-e Murd | Dasht-e Pirgheyb | Dasht-e Qir | Dasht-e Rais | Dasht-e Rangrizi | Dasht-e Razm-e Musa Arabi | Dasht-e Razm-e Olya | Dasht-e Shahreza | Dasht-e Shur | Dasht-e Soltanabad-e Chahar | Dasht-e Soltanabad-e Do | Dasht-e Soltanabad-e Seh | Dasht-e Soltanabad-e Yek | Dasht-e Taq | Dasht-e Vel | Dashti | Dashtollah | Dast-e Khezr | Dastejeh | Dastjerd | Dastjerd | Date Packing Factory | Davan | Davazdahi | Debir Shadab | Deh Balai Kherqeh | Deh Barin | Deh Barm | Deh Beh | Deh Bid | Deh Bid | Deh Bin | Deh Chah | Deh Chasht | Deh Damcheh | Deh Dashti | Deh Fazel | Deh Fish | Deh Gah | Deh Gah | Deh Gap-e Mahmudi | Deh Gerdu | Deh Kadeh Salami | Deh Kheyr | Deh Kheyr-e Pain | Deh Kohneh | Deh Kohneh | Deh Kohneh | Deh Kohneh-ye Kamaraj | Deh Mian | Deh Mian | Deh Now | Deh Now | Deh Now | Deh Now | Deh Now | Deh Now | Deh Now | Deh Now-e Fazeli | Deh Now-e Khonj | Deh Now-e Sadat-e Bala | Deh Now-e Sadat-e Pain | Deh Now-e Shurab | Deh Now-ye Bahman | Deh Qanun | Deh Rud | Deh Sarv | Deh Sheykh | Deh Sheykh | Deh Shib | Deh Shib-e Mirza Hasani | Deh Vazir | Deh Zir | Deh Zir | Dehak | Dehak | Dehak-e Aliabad | Dehban | Dehbid | Dehdaq | Dehdari | Dehdari-ye Shurab | Deh-e Bala | Deh-e Bala | Deh-e Gardaneh Rangak | Deh-e Khalil | Deh-e Maleku | Deh-e Meydan | Deh-e Pagah | Deh-e Pain | Deh-e Pas Qalat | Deh-e Sardar | Deh-e Ziarat | Dehgah | Dehgah | Dehgah-e Kandehi | Dehkestan | Dehkuyeh | Dehlaleh | Dehmurd | Dehnow Kashkuli | Dehnow Qalandari | Dehnow | Dehnow | Dehnow | Dehnow | Dehnow-e Bushkan | Dehnow-e Chamran | Dehnow-e Enqelab | Dehnow-e Ghuri | Dehnow-e Markazi | Dehnow-e Moqimi | Dehnow-ye Sadat-e Vosta | Dehpagah | Dehqanan | Dehram | Dehu | Dehuiyeh | Dehuiyeh | Dehuyeh | Dehuyeh | Dehuyeh | Deli Amin Nazer | Deli Bik | Delvar-e Kuh Siah | Denjan | Derafsh-e Olya | Derafsh-e Sofla | Deris | Derk Mah Shuri | Dermanehzar | Dermanehzar-e Do | Dermeh | Dezh Gah | Dezhabad | Dideh Banki | Didehban | Dikanak | Dilemi | Dim Zelleh | Dimah Mil Olya | Dimah Mil Sofla | Dimeh Sorkh | Dinakan | Dinbaghan | Dindarlu | Dipun | Do Borji | Do Estakhr | Do Konarun-e Zirdu | Do Kuhak | Do Kuhak | Do Rah | Do Shakh | Dobiran | Dobiran Water Company | Dom Afshan | Donbildan | Dordaneh | Dordaneh | Dorudzan | Dorudzan Dam Water Company | Dorunak | Doshak | Doshman Ziari | Dowbaneh | Dowbaran | Dowdej | Dowdeman | Dowdjabad | Dowlatabad | Dowlatabad | Dowlatabad | Dowlatabad | Dowlatabad | Dowlatabad | Dowlatabad | Dowlatabad | Dowlatabad | Dowlatabad | Dowlatabad | Dowlatabad | Dowlatabad | Dowlatabad | Dowlatabad | Dowlatabad | Dowlatabad | Dowlatabad-e Dasht-e Seh Chah | Dowlatabad-e Qadim-e Yek | Dowsiran | Dowtujahan | Dozdak-e Kuchek | Dozdak-e Olya | Dozdak-e Sofla | Dozdan | Dozdkordak | Duban | Dudej | Dudek-e Olya | Dudek-e Sofla | Dudek-e Vosta | Dudman | Dugan-e Olya | Dugan-e Sofla | Dulab-e Bala | Dulab-e Pain | Dul-e Mahi | Dul-e Mish | Durag-e Atabak | Durag-e Cheshmeh Konari | Durag-e Madineh | Dusrakhan | Dustabad | Duzeh | Duzeh

E
Ebrahimabad | Ebrahimabad | Ebrahimabad | Efzar | Ehengah | Ehsham | Ekrad | Elyasabad | Elyasabad | Emad Deh | Emadabad | Emamzadeh Ali Akbar | Emamzadeh Ali | Emamzadeh Aqil | Emamzadeh Bazm | Emamzadeh Esmail | Emamzadeh Ganju | Emamzadeh Mohammad | Emamzadeh Monir | Emamzadeh Pir Abu ol Hasan | Emamzadeh Seyyed Hajj Gharib | Emamzadeh Seyyed Mohammad Hoseyn | Emamzadeh Shah Alamdar | Emamzadeh Shah Esmail | Emamzadeh Shah Gharib | Emamzadeh Shah Nur ol Din | Emamzadeh Shir Mard | Emamzadeh Zaher | Emarat | Emarat | Eqbalabad | Eqbalabad | Eqbalabad | Eqlid | Esfaderan | Esfanjan | Esfian | Eshgaft-e Rumeh | Eshkaft | Eshkaftestan | Eshkanan | Eshkanan Communication Station | Eshkeri | Eshkowri | Eslamabad | Eslamabad | Eslamabad | Eslamabad | Eslamabad | Eslamabad | Eslamabad | Eslamabad | Eslamabad | Eslamabad | Eslamabad | Eslamabad | Eslamabad | Eslamabad | Eslamabad | Eslamabad | Eslamabad | Eslamabad | Eslamabad | Eslamabad | Eslamabad | Eslamabad | Eslamabad | Eslamabad-e Chehel Cheshmeh | Eslamabad-e Ghani | Eslamabad-e Javid | Eslamabad-e Tang Shib | Eslamiyeh | Eslamlu Ayili | Esmailabad | Esmailabad | Esmailabad | Esmailabad | Esmailabad | Esmailabad | Esmailabad | Esmailabad | Esmailabad | Esmailabad-e Pain | Espahri | Estahban | Estakhr | Estas | Evaz | Ezzabad | Ezzabad | Ezzahabad

F
Fadagh | Fadami | Fahlian-e Olya | Fahlian-e Sofla | Fakhr Makan | Fakhrabad | Fakhrabad | Fakhrabad | Fakhrabad | Fal | Falak | Falunak | Faraj Beygi | Farashband | Farhadabad | Fariab | Fars Construction Company | Fars Integrated Meat Factory | Farsijan | Faruq | Faryab | Fasa | Fasa Industrial Workshops | Fathabad | Fathabad | Fathabad | Fathabad | Fathabad | Fathabad | Fathabad | Fathabad | Fathabad-e Deh-e Arab | Fathabad-e Olya | Fathabad-e Sofla | Fathabad-e Sofla | Fazeli | Fazili | Fedashkuyeh | Fenjan | Fereshteh Jan | Feshan | Feshangan | Feshargaz Amplification Station | Feyzabad | Feyzabad | Feyzabad | Fiduyeh | Fijan | Firuzabad Teacher Centre | Firuzabad | Firuzi | Firuzi | Firuzi | Firuzi | Firuzi | Fishvar | Fishvar | Folo Jan | Forud | Fotuhabad | Fotuhabad

G
Gabdegah | Gach Boru-e Bala | Gach Darvazeh | Gach Mohammad Hasan | Gach Tahmasabi | Gachgaran | Gachi | Gachkharan | Gahluyeh | Gahrab | Gal Gah | Galeh Dani Hajj Askar Jowkar | Galguni | Galkun | Galleh Dar | Galleh Dar | Galleh Dari Gholam Hoseyn-e Malekpur | Galleh Dari Hajj Morady | Galleh Dari Mohammad Nuratbayi | Galleh Dari Tal Puk | Galleh Dari va Gavdari Malbareh | Galleh Zan | Galu Boraq | Galugah | Gang-e Risheh | Ganjehi | Ganjgan | Gar Kud | Gardan Kalat | Gardan Kolah | Gardan Qalat | Gardan-e Tol Bardangan | Gardaneh-ye Jenjan | Gardaneh-ye Kol Hasank | Gareh | Garkushk | Garmabad | Garmanjan | Garmeh | Garmosht | Garow | Garreh Nazerabad | Garrmish-e Naderlu | Gav Bast | Gav Koshak | Gav Piazi | Gav Shakhi | Gavchah | Gavdari-ye Mohammad Qoli Rusta | Gavdari-ye Shamsabad | Gavmishan | Gaz Gavban | Gazdan | Gazdan-e Abbas Abdollah | Gaz-e Kheng | Gazivaz | Gel Berenji | Gelar | Gelileh-ye Javid | Gelkuyeh | Gelumehr | Gerash | Gerazaruyi | Gerdab-e Piazi | Gerdanbeh | Gervan | Gez Boland | Gezak | Ghadirgah | Gharbi | Gharibabad | Gheyb-e Elahi | Ghiasabad | Ghiasabad | Ghiasabad | Ghiasi | Gholamabad | Ghuri | Giahzar | Gikh | Gol Babakan | Gol Gerd | Gol Khun | Gol Makan-e Baseri | Gol Makan-e Qeshlaq | Gol Sorkhi | Goldamcheh | Goldasht-e Olya | Goldasht-e Sofla | Gol-e Kharg | Goleh Dari Mohammad Hoseyn Mohammadi | Goli Kuh | Golijan | Golpa | Golunar | Gombakan | Gonag | Gonbad | Gonbedu | Gonjalu | Gorazi | Gordeh | Gorgana | Gorgdan | Gorgi | Gorizan | Goshnekan | Gowd Ab Ashtar | Gowd Kahluyeh | Gowd Shaneh | Gowd Zagh | Gowd-e Hasan | Gowd-e Kalur | Gowd-e Lir | Gowd-e Zereshk | Gowri | Gowzan | Grain Development Company | Gudarzi | Gugi | Gulf Road Transportation Depot | Gurab Guh | Gurab | Gurab-e Rostam | Gurak | Gur-e Espid | Gur-e Khar | Gurizeneh | Gushti | Guyim | Guyim | Gypsum Mine

H
Habashabad | Habibabad | Habibabad-e Durag | Hadayiq Culture and Industry | Hadiabad | Hadiabad | Haft Asiab | Haft Dasht-e Olya | Haft Kol | Haft Pareh | Haftavan | Haftjan | Haftkhan | Hajji Tahereh | Hajjiabad | Hajjiabad Integated Livestock Company | Hajjiabad | Hajjiabad | Hajjiabad | Hajjiabad | Hajjiabad | Hajjiabad | Hajjiabad | Hajjiabad | Hajjiabad | Hajjiabad | Hajjiabad | Hajjiabad | Hajjiabad | Hajjiabad | Hajjiabad-e Ghuri | Hajjiabad-e Korbal | Hajjiabad-e Mallu | Hajjiabad-e Muzi | Hajjiabad-e Pas Kuhak | Hakavan | Hakim Bashi-ye Bala | Hakim Bashi-ye Hoseynabad | Hamaijan Industrial Estate | Hamandeh | Hamashahr | Hamdamabad | Hamidabad | Hamidabad | Hammami | Hamzeh Beygi | Hana | Hangam Cooperative | Hangi-ye Sofla | Happan | Harar-e Kalgah-e Shiraz | Harariz | Harayjan | Harm | Harom | Harun va Sakez | Hasan Aqai | Hasan Khani | Hasanabad | Hasanabad | Hasanabad | Hasanabad | Hasanabad | Hasanabad | Hasanabad | Hasanabad | Hasanabad | Hasanabad | Hasanabad | Hasanabad | Hasanabad | Hasanabad | Hasanabad-e Ab Konar | Hasanabad-e Abu ol Hasani | Hasanabad-e Bam Furd | Hasanabad-e Kamin | Hasanabad-e Kushkak | Hasanabad-e Margemari | Hasanabad-e Olya | Hasanabad-e Padam | Hasanabad-e Qadamgah | Hasanabad-e Sanjarlu | Hasanabad-e Sofla | Hasanabad-e Tall Kamin | Hasan-e Kamali | Hasani Pacher | Hashemabad | Hashemabad | Hashivar Livestock Company | Hashtijan | Hejrat | Helalabad | Hellak | Hemmat | Hemmatabad | Hemmatabad | Heraj | Herbedan | Hesamabad | Hesami | Hesar-e Dashtak | Heshmatabad | Heshmatiyeh | Heydarabad | Heydarabad | Heydarabad | Heydarabad | Heydarabad | Heydarabad | Heydarabad-e Baba Monir | Heydari | Hezar Balut | Hezar Darreh | Hezar | Hirom | Hojjatabad | Hojjatabad-e Kaseh Rud | Honguyeh | Honifaqan | Horgan | Hormud | Hormud-e Mehr Khui | Hormuj | Hoseyn Kutah | Hoseynabad | Hoseynabad | Hoseynabad | Hoseynabad | Hoseynabad | Hoseynabad | Hoseynabad | Hoseynabad | Hoseynabad | Hoseynabad | Hoseynabad | Hoseynabad | Hoseynabad | Hoseynabad | Hoseynabad | Hoseynabad | Hoseynabad | Hoseynabad | Hoseynabad | Hoseynabad | Hoseynabad | Hoseynabad | Hoseynabad | Hoseynabad | Hoseynabad | Hoseynabad | Hoseynabad | Hoseynabad-e Arab Sheybani | Hoseynabad-e Ardeshiri | Hoseynabad-e Barkeh Puz | Hoseynabad-e Dardan | Hoseynabad-e Deylami | Hoseynabad-e Fishtaqeh | Hoseynabad-e Harom | Hoseynabad-e Jadid | Hoseynabad-e Katak | Hoseynabad-e Khan Qoli | Hoseynabad-e Najafabad | Hoseynabad-e Qoroq | Hoseynabad-e Rostam | Hoseynabad-e Sar Tavileh | Hoseynabad-e Sarab | Hoseynabad-e Saravi | Hoseynabad-e Sargar | Hoseynabad-e Surmaq | Hoseynabad-e Tang-e Khomar | Hoseynabad-e Tarman | Hoseynaliabad | Hud | Hunza | Hurbaf | Hurz | Hydrometric Station

I
Iduyeh | Ij | Ijani | Ilan | Industrial Estate | Industrial Estate | Institute of Agriculture Phases 2 and 3 | Iran Engineerging Company | Izad Khvast-e Basri | Izadkhvast

J
Jades | Jadir | Jadval-e Now | Jadval-e Torki | Jafar Jen | Jafarabad | Jafarabad | Jafarabad | Jafarabad | Jafarabad | Jafarabad | Jafarabad | Jafarabad | Jafarabad | Jafarabad | Jafarabad | Jafarabad | Jafarabad-e Olya | Jafarabad-e Sofla | Jahadabad | Jahadabad | Jahan Nama | Jahanabad | Jahanabad | Jahanabad | Jahanabad | Jahreh | Jahrom | Jahrom Airport | Jalalabad | Jalalabad | Jalalabad | Jalalabad-e Tavalayi | Jalilabad | Jam Bozorgi | Jamal Beyg | Jamal Kar | Jamalabad | Jamalabad | Jamalabad | Jamalabad | Jamalabad | Jamalabad | Jamali | Jamar Jan | Jamghan | Jamsi | Jangli | Janguyeh | Janiabad | Janiabad | Janiabad | Jannat Shahr | Jaresqan | Jariabad | Jarmosht-e Bala | Jarmosht-e Pain | Jarri | Jashahr | Javadabad | Javadieh | Javadiyeh | Javadiyeh-ye Bugar | Javaliqan | Javanan | Javark | Jaydasht | Jazin | Jelian | Jelyan | Jenjan-e Markazi | Jereh | Jeshnian | Jeshnian | Jevenjan | Jezzeh | Jian | Jian | Jidarzar | Jigardan | Jolow Dar | Jonbed | Jorgheh | Jovinow | Jowhari | Jowkan | Jowkan-e Pain | Jowzar-e Bakesh | Jowzar-e Javid | Jowz-e Kangari | Jowzjan | Jub Khaleh-ye Olya | Jub Khaleh-ye Sofla | Jubal | Junaki | Juy Bazm | Juy Sefid | Juyan | Juyjan | Juyom | Juzaqdan

K
Kabeh | Kabkabad | Kachuyeh | Kafdehak | Kafeh | Kafr | Kafri | Kaftarak | Kahkaran | Kahkuh | Kahneh | Kahnehbid | Kahnekuyeh | Kahnuiyeh Darz | Kahnuyeh | Kahnuyeh | Kahrizak | Kahtu | Kajai | Kakan | Kakoli | Kal Ghur | Kal Takhteh | Kal | Kalagh Jiru | Kalani | Kalatun | Kalgah Shiraz | Kalgah | Kalgah-e Olya | Kalgah-e Sofla | Kalhor | Kalur Karim | Kamalabad | Kamalabad | Kamalabad | Kamalabad | Kamalabad | Kamalabad | Kamali | Kaman Keshi | Kamar Zard | Kamarabad-e Arnadi | Kamaraj | Kamarlu | Kamfiruz | Kamjan | Kamur Sukhteh | Kan Rud | Kandaran | Kandar-e Abdol Reza | Kandar-e Kolah Boland | Kandar-e Mohammadi | Kandar-e Sheykh | Kandijan | Kangashi | Kankan | Kapar Khani | Kar Ashub | Kar Panbehi | Kar Sorkh | Karadeh | Karai | Karbalai Mohammad Hoseyn | Karbalayi Mohseni | Kareh Tavi | Kargah | Kargah | Kargah-e Mahal Ahdas Shahrak ol Zahra | Karimabad | Karimabad | Karimabad | Karimabad-e Eskandari | Karimabad-e Jadval-e Now | Karimeh | Karishki | Karkuyeh | Karmard | Karmowstaj | Karreh Bas | Karreh Dar | Karrehkan | Karun | Karyan | Karzin | Kasakan | Kasr ol Dasht | Katak | Katak | Kateh Gonbad | Kateh Kareh | Kateh Mian | Kateh | Kateh-ye Khafr-e Olya | Kateh-ye Khafr-e Sofla | Katenan | Katuyeh | Kavar | Kazemabad | Kazemabad | Kazerun | Kazerun Ceramic Tile Company | Kedenj | Kel Konar | Kelakoli | Kelestan | Kelisiun | Kemili | Kenareh | Kenas-e Olya | Kenas-e Sofla | Kerachi | Keradeh | Kerdil | Kereft | Keshavarzi | Key Zarrin | Khabis | Khader | Khaftar | Khakak Arab | Khalaf Tahuneh | Khaledabad | Khaledah | Khalifehha | Khalili | Khalji | Khaljuy | Khalu Mohammad Ali | Khalur | Khan Baghi | Khan Nahr | Khanabad | Khaneh Ket | Khaneh Khamis-e Olya | Khaneh Khamis-e Sofla | Khaneh Zenyan | Khani Ab | Khani Yek | Khaniman | Khanimeh-ye Bala | Khanimeh-ye Pain | Khanjanabad | Kharagan | Kharameh | Kharestan | Kharestan-e Olya | Kharestan-e Sofla | Kharsor | Kharzahreh | Khasht | Khatiri | Khatunak | Khavaran | Kherengan | Kherqeh | Kherreh | Khesht | Kheshti | Khevid Jan | Khevid-e Mobaraki | Kheyrabad | Kheyrabad | Kheyrabad | Kheyrabad | Kheyrabad | Kheyrabad | Kheyrabad | Kheyrabad | Kheyrabad | Kheyrabad | Kheyrabad | Kheyrabad | Kheyrabad | Kheyrabad | Kheyrabad | Kheyrabad | Kheyrabad-e Hajji Ahmad | Kheyrabad-e Koruni | Kheyrabad-e Tulalli | Kheyratabad-e Barkatak | Kheyrgu | Khobreh | Khobriz | Khodaabad | Khodabakhsh-e Zaval | Khodadadi | Khollar | Khonak | Khong-e Taheri | Khonj | Khonj Free Islamic University | Khonjesht | Khonk-e Pir Sabz | Khorasani | Khormai | Khormayak | Khorram Makan | Khorramabad | Khorramabad | Khorrambid Industrial Estate | Khorramzar | Khoruslu | Khoshkabad | Khosrow Shirin | Khosrowabad | Khosuyeh | Khumeh Zar | Khumeh Zar-e Olya | Khumeh Zar-e Sofla | Khun Hajji | Khur Ab | Khur | Khur | Khurgan | Khurnejan | Khushbajan | Khuzi | Khvajeh Jamali | Khvajeh Jamali | Khvajeh Morad | Khvajehi | Khvordeh Darreh | Khvorjan | Khvorkosh | Khvosh Ab | Khvosh Ab | Khvosh Ab | Khvosh Makan | Khvoshabad | Kianabad | Kikomdan | Kimalu | Kodow | Kohneh Borhan | Kohneh Sorkh | Kohneh | Kohneh-ye Jadid | Kola Siah | Komasij | Komehr | Konar Malek | Konardan | Konardan | Konar-e Hajji-ye Shekari | Konar-e Khoshk | Konar-e Ziarat | Konareh | Konareh-ye Rostam | Konarmaktab | Konartakhteh | Kondazi | Konow | Kord Sheykh | Kord Shul | Kord-e Shul | Kordeh Sheykh | Koreh Muchi | Korehi | Korehi | Korezar | Korrehi | Korsiyah | Koruni | Koshku | Koshkuh | Koturi | Kowr Boland | Kowraki | Kowreh | Kud Zuru | Kudian | Kudian | Kudin | Kuh Gari-ye Kheyrabad | Kuh Sabz | Kuh Sefid | Kuhak | Kuhak-e Do | Kuhanjan | Kuh-e Dera | Kuhenjan | Kuhjerd | Kulbakul-e Bozorg | Kulbakul-e Kuchak | Kuluyeh | Kupan | Kupon-e Olya | Kupon-e Sofla | Kupon-e Vosta | Kurak | Kuraki | Kuraki | Kurazag-e Now | Kurdeh | Kurdeh | Kuroshabad | Kusangan | Kushk Sar | Kushk | Kushk | Kushk | Kushkak | Kushkak | Kushkak | Kushk-e Banian | Kushk-e Baqeri | Kushk-e Bidak | Kushk-e Esmailabad | Kushk-e Hasanabad | Kushk-e Hezar | Kushk-e Khalil | Kushk-e Mohammadabad | Kushk-e Mowla | Kushk-e Pas Qalat | Kushk-e Qazi | Kushk-e Sar Tang | Kushk-e Sofla

L
Lab Eshkan | Lachareh | Laghar | Lagharan | Lah Ab | Lahiji | Laleh Gun | Lamerd | Lapui | Lar Pasta Company | Lar | Lard Khazan | Lashkhareh | Latifi | Lavar Khesht | Lavarestan | Lay Hana | Lay Raz | Lay Zangan | Lay-e Khorrami | Lehqorbani-ye Olya | Lehqorbani-ye Sofla | Leshgun | Lirmanjan | Lirui-ye Sofla | Lohrasb | Loqman Cheshmeh | Lowzu

M
Macaroni Factory | Macaroni Factory | Madan-e Surameh | Madar Dokhtar | Madar Soleyman | Madavan | Madeh Banan | Madevan | Madkhun | Mah Farrokhan | Mah Kord | Mah Salari | Mahal Ahdas-e Sad Rudbal | Mahall ol Din | Mahalleh-ye Akbari | Maharlu Kohneh | Maharlu Now | Mahdiyeh | Mah-e Firuzan | Mahjan | Mahjanabad | Mahlacheh | Mahmansaray Shomareh-ye Do | Mahmeleh | Mahmudabad | Mahmudabad | Mahmudabad | Mahmudabad | Mahmudabad | Mahmudabad | Mahmudabad | Mahmudabad | Mahmudabad | Mahmudabad | Mahmudabad-e Do Dang | Mahmudabad-e Olya | Mahmudabad-e Olya | Mahmudabad-e Seh Dang | Mahmudabad-e Sofla | Mahmudabad-e Yek Dang | Main | Majdabad | Mal Hajji | Malavan | Malay-e Anbar | Mal-e Ahmadi | Mal-e Mahmud | Malekabad | Malekabad | Malekabad | Malekabad | Malekabad | Malekabad | Malicheh Sheykh | Malicheh | Malyan | Mambalu | Mamu | Mangun | Manian | Mansurabad | Mansurabad | Mansurabad | Mansurabad | Mansurabad | Mansurabad | Mansurabad | Mansurabad | Mansurabad | Mansurabad | Mansurabad-e Olya | Mansurabad-e Sofla | Mansuriyeh | Manuchehr Abbasi | Manuchehri | Maqsudabad | Maqsudabad | Maqsudabad | Maragallu | Marbuyeh | Margan | Marghdari-ye Hajji Hasan Kuh Bar | Marian | Marjanak | Marmeh | Marun | Marvashkan | Marvdasht | Marvdasht Agricultural Centre | Marzu | Masarm-e Olya | Masarm-e Sofla | Mashayekh | Mashayekh | Mashil Bandar-e Do | Mashtan | Masiri | Masumabad | Masumabad | Mayyu | Maz | Mazayjan | Mazayjan | Mazekan | Mazraeh | Mazraeh | Mazraeh-ye Abbasabad-e Morvarid | Mazraeh-ye Abdol Hoseyn Moradi | Mazraeh-ye Abdol Hoseyn Qobadi | Mazraeh-ye Ahmad Manuchehri | Mazraeh-ye Ahsham Molai | Mazraeh-ye Akbar Borhani | Mazraeh-ye Ali Reza Baharlu | Mazraeh-ye Amirabad | Mazraeh-ye Amrollah Panahpur | Mazraeh-ye Amrollah Rezai | Mazraeh-ye Aqa Hoseyn | Mazraeh-ye Asadi | Mazraeh-ye Askar Sheybani | Mazraeh-ye Baba Abdollah | Mazraeh-ye Badabad | Mazraeh-ye Bandubast | Mazraeh-ye Bangalu Zardaval | Mazraeh-ye Baqr Sheybani | Mazraeh-ye Bidestan | Mazraeh-ye Bidu | Mazraeh-ye Chah Dozdan | Mazraeh-ye Chah-e Shur-e Sofla | Mazraeh-ye Chal Kangari | Mazraeh-ye Chari | Mazraeh-ye Deh Dol | Mazraeh-ye Deh-e Dinari | Mazraeh-ye Deli-ye Rangak Rashidi | Mazraeh-ye Diden Now | Mazraeh-ye Dowlatabad | Mazraeh-ye Dulab-e Vasat | Mazraeh-ye Emamzadeh Abdollah | Mazraeh-ye Eslam Sadaqet | Mazraeh-ye Eslamabad | Mazraeh-ye Esmail Esmaili | Mazraeh-ye Fakhrabad | Mazraeh-ye Fakhrabi | Mazraeh-ye Fallahi | Mazraeh-ye Farhadi | Mazraeh-ye Fathabad | Mazraeh-ye Fereydun Puya | Mazraeh-ye Gachi | Mazraeh-ye Galak | Mazraeh-ye Gholam Hoseyn Khan Masumi | Mazraeh-ye Gurki Malekzadeh | Mazraeh-ye Hajjiabad | Mazraeh-ye Hajjiabad | Mazraeh-ye Hamataj Bahbahani | Mazraeh-ye Harunak | Mazraeh-ye Henduyeh | Mazraeh-ye Huzang | Mazraeh-ye Jafarabad | Mazraeh-ye Javadastavar | Mazraeh-ye Jowzar | Mazraeh-ye Karmani | Mazraeh-ye Karmshah Karmi | Mazraeh-ye Katu | Mazraeh-ye Khodadad Sheybani | Mazraeh-ye Khukand | Mazraeh-ye Kurshabad | Mazraeh-ye Lahrasb | Mazraeh-ye Lard Khun | Mazraeh-ye Las | Mazraeh-ye Madan | Mazraeh-ye Maghilan | Mazraeh-ye Mahbati | Mazraeh-ye Mallu | Mazraeh-ye Mehdiabad | Mazraeh-ye Mehdiabad-e Now | Mazraeh-ye Mohammad Abbasi | Mazraeh-ye Mohammad Karam Sharifi | Mazraeh-ye Mohammad Karimi | Mazraeh-ye Mohammad Masumi | Mazraeh-ye Mohammad Mazidi | Mazraeh-ye Mohammad Qobadi | Mazraeh-ye Moruji | Mazraeh-ye Nazem Sur | Mazraeh-ye Nuli | Mazraeh-ye Pahn | Mazraeh-ye Pahna | Mazraeh-ye Palangi | Mazraeh-ye Panj Chah | Mazraeh-ye Parvarsh Mahi | Mazraeh-ye Pater Chakhar | Mazraeh-ye Pir Badam | Mazraeh-ye Posht Kak | Mazraeh-ye Puram Shahadi Anhas | Mazraeh-ye Qanbarabad | Mazraeh-ye Rah Javian | Mazraeh-ye Rahmatabad | Mazraeh-ye Rajab Ali Lahrasabi | Mazraeh-ye Razak | Mazraeh-ye Reza Mohsul | Mazraeh-ye Sadeqabad | Mazraeh-ye Sadeqiyeh | Mazraeh-ye Sang Bar | Mazraeh-ye Sarhadi | Mazraeh-ye Seh Chah Kuh Sorkh | Mazraeh-ye Seh Qanat | Mazraeh-ye Seyf ol Din | Mazraeh-ye Shah Ali | Mazraeh-ye Shah Reza Karmi va Shork | Mazraeh-ye Shah Taj | Mazraeh-ye Shahbazi | Mazraeh-ye Shahid Dast Gheyb | Mazraeh-ye Shekaft Zun | Mazraeh-ye Shirvani va Shorka | Mazraeh-ye Shuru Hajjiabad | Mazraeh-ye Shuru Hoseyni | Mazraeh-ye Talami | Mazraeh-ye Tall Goreh | Mazraeh-ye Tall Roshtan | Mazraeh-ye Tall Sangari | Mazraeh-ye Tall Sangbary | Mazraeh-ye Tarvij Gandam | Mazraeh-ye Tayfeh Galeh Zan | Mazraeh-ye Tayifeh Farhadlu | Mazraeh-ye Tireh Bahi | Mazraeh-ye Vali Mohammad Qohrmani | Mazraeh-ye Yadollah Jafari | Mazraeh-ye Yunes Hamidi | Mazraeh-ye Zeman Rostami | Mazraeh-ye Zeytunak | Mazru | Mehbudi-ye Olya | Mehbudi-ye Sofla | Mehdi Residential Housing | Mehdiabad | Mehdiabad | Mehdiabad | Mehdiabad | Mehdiabad | Mehdiabad | Mehdiabad | Mehdiabad | Mehkuyeh-ye Olya | Mehkuyeh-ye Sofla | Mehmanabad | Mehrabad | Mehrabad | Mehrabad | Mehrabad | Mehrabad | Mehrabad | Mehrabad-e Mandegari | Mehrabad-e Mazidi | Mehrenjan | Mehrenjan | Mehrian | Mehrian | Meleh Galeh | Melleh Kangun | Melleh Khik Andeh | Menaruyeh | Meshkan | Meydan | Meydanak | Meygoli | Meymand | Mezijan | Mian Qaleh | Mian Rud | Miandeh | Mianeh | Mianeh-ye Jenjan | Mianrud | Midjan | Mij | Milatun | Miluyeh | Mina | Mir Hasani | Mir Kheyrollah | Mir Maleki | Mirchakak | Mirchaki | Mirisah | Mirzaali | Mirzamohammadi-ye Bala | Mirzamohammadi-ye Pain | Mishan-e Olya | Mishan-e Sofla | Miyan Deh | Miyaneh-ye Olya | Miyaneh-ye Sofla | Mobarakabad | Mobarakabad | Mobarakabad | Mobarakabad | Mobarakeh | Mobarakeh | Moezzabad-e Gurgir | Moezzabad-e Jaberi | Mogharrab-e Do | Mohammad Qasemi | Mohammad Zeyna | Mohammadabad | Mohammadabad | Mohammadabad | Mohammadabad | Mohammadabad | Mohammadabad | Mohammadabad | Mohammadabad | Mohammadabad | Mohammadabad | Mohammadabad | Mohammadabad-e Sofla | Mohammad-e Olya | Mohemmabad | Mohit Ab | Mohr | Mohsenabad | Moinabad | Moinabad | Mokhtarabad-e Bon Rud | Molaim Soap Factory | Molay-ye Sefid | Molk-e Ali | Molla Arreh | Molla Balut | Mollai | Monj-e Olya | Monj-e Sofla | Moqaberi | Moqarrab-e Yek | Moqbelabad | Moradabad | Moradabad | Moradabad-e Kolah Siah | Moraskhun-e Olya | Moraskhun-e Sofla | Morghan | Morgh-e Bozorg | Morgh-e Kuchak | Morshedi | Morz | Morzian | Moshkan | Moshtagan | Moslemabad | Mowmenabad | Mowr Deraz | Mowruzeh | Mowzar | Mozaffarabad | Mozaffarabad | Mozaffari | Mozaffari | Mozaffari | Multul | Mur Pahn | Muraki | Murchagi | Murdak | Murdak | Murd-e Susani | Murderaz | Murdestan | Murdestan | Murdi | Murekord | Murjan | Murj-e Shahrak | Murkash | Murmir | Mushkan | Musqan

N
Naameh | Nachar-e Pain | Nahr-e Hasan | Naimabad | Najafabad | Najafabad | Najafabad | Najafabad | Najafabad | Najafabad | Najafabad | Najafabad-e Sorkhi | Najamabad | Najmabad | Najmabad | Nakhelstan-e Galleh Dar | Nakhelstan-e Mohr | Namak Ruy | Namazgah | Narak | Narak-e Qasemi | Nardeh Shahr | Narenjan-e Jadid | Nargesabad | Nargesi | Nargesi-ye Deli Qayid Shafi | Nargeszar-e Famur | Naripat | Narkuh | Narmun | Naru | Naseh | Naseh Anjireh | Naserabad | Naserabad | Nasirabad | Nasirabad | Nasirabad | Nasirabad | Nasirabad | Nasirabad | Nasrabad | Nasrabad | Nasrabad | Nasrabad | Nasrovan | Navaygan | Navbandi | Nazarabad | Nazarabad | Negarestan Research Station | Negarestan | Nehuyeh | Nematabad | Nematabad | Nematabad | Nematabad | Neqareh Khaneh | Nerman | Neshahr | Neyriz | Neyriz Integrated Quarry | Neza-e Kuchek | Neza-e Olya | Nezamabad | Nezamabad | Nezamabad | Nezamabad | Nezamabad | Nezamabad-e Jadid | Nilgunak | Nilu | Nimdeh | Nivar-e Olya | Nivar-e Sofla | Noh Tan | Nosrat | Nosratabad | Now Bandegan | Now Dad | Now Sanjan | Nowabad | Nowabad | Nowdan | Nowdaran | Nowgak | Nowruzabad | Nowruzan | Nowruzan | Nuhi | Nujin | Nur ol Dini | Nurabad | Nurabad | Nurabad | Nurabad | Nurabad | Nurai-ye Now | Nushk | Nuyeh

O
Olya-e Khaledabad | Omidiyeh | Orojabad | Owdli Shakestan | Owlad-e Chelku | Ozun Darreh

P
Pa Qaleh | Paberkeh | Pahlavani | Pahna Pahn | Pahnabeh | Pahnay Behi | Pain Kuh | Pakal | Palangari-ye Kohneh | Palangari-ye Now | Palangi | Panal | Pangaru | Panj Mahall | Panj Shir | Papun-e Olya | Papun-e Sofla | Paqalat | Par Ahu | Par Eshkaft | Par Sefid | Par Zeytun | Parak | Par-e Molla | Par-e Nobar | Parigi | Parishan | Pariu-ye Arab | Parizadlu | Parkbarm | Parsebil | Parzeh | Pas Band | Pas Bol | Pas Kuhak | Pasaki | Pasalari | Pasheh Dan | Paskahak | Paskhan | Patal Rahimi | Patal | Pay Taft Jalil | Pazanuyeh | Pehrest-e Olya | Pehrest-e Sofla | Pehun | Perin | Petrochemical Staff Housing | Petrol Station | Pey Komak | Pich Kuh | Pir Barzgu | Pir Gheyb | Pir Hoseyni | Pir Mur | Pir Sabz Ali | Pirali | Pir-e Morad | Pir-e Sabz | Pireh Sorkh-e Bala | Pireh Sorkh-e Pain | Pirehdan | Pol Khoda Afarin | Pol Murd | Pol Shekasteh | Pol-e Abgineh | Pol-e Fahlian | Pol-e Fasa | Porzi | Posht Par | Posht Pari | Posht-e Par | Posht-e Par-e Soleyman | Pudenak-e Jowngan | Pumping Station Number Two | Puskan | Puzeh Badi | Puzeh-ye Chahar Qash | Puzeh-ye Chaharabi | Puzeh-ye Hezar Qadami |

Q
Qabaleh-ye Firuzi | Qabr-e Sefid | Qabtar Qoluy-e Olya | Qabtar Qoluy-e Sofla | Qadamabad | Qadaman | Qadamgah | Qadamgah | Qadamgah | Qaderabad | Qaderabad | Qaedan | Qaedi-ye Seh | Qaemiyeh | Qalamdan | Qalamdan-e Vosta | Qalamu | Qalandar Kashteh | Qalat | Qalat | Qalat | Qalat | Qalatak | Qalat-e Godar Boneh | Qalat-e Khvar | Qalat-e Nilu | Qalatuyeh | Qaleh Beyg | Qaleh Biyaban | Qaleh Chogha | Qaleh Chubi | Qaleh Gachi | Qaleh Gar-e Fahlian | Qaleh Gholam Abdollah | Qaleh Karimi | Qaleh Kharabeh | Qaleh Mahmudi | Qaleh Meseh | Qaleh Mozaffary | Qaleh Now | Qaleh Now | Qaleh Now | Qaleh Now | Qaleh Now | Qaleh Now-e Hashivar | Qaleh Now-e Palangari | Qaleh Sang | Qaleh Sangi | Qaleh Sargah | Qaleh Sargodar | Qaleh Sefid | Qaleh Sohrab | Qaleh | Qaleh-e Ali Baba | Qaleh-e Moradi | Qaleh-ye Abadeh | Qaleh-ye Abbasabad | Qaleh-ye Abdollah Beygi | Qaleh-ye Ali | Qaleh-ye Ali | Qaleh-ye Bahman | Qaleh-ye Doktar Omad | Qaleh-ye Esmaili | Qaleh-ye Hajj Zu ol Faqar | Qaleh-ye Hajji Mohammad | Qaleh-ye Juy | Qaleh-ye Kachalha | Qaleh-ye Kaduyeh | Qaleh-ye Karbalai Mohammad Ali | Qaleh-ye Khalili | Qaleh-ye Khvajeh | Qaleh-ye Kohneh-ye Kavar | Qaleh-ye Mashhadi Karim | Qaleh-ye Mir Aqa | Qaleh-ye Mir Hasan | Qaleh-ye Mirza | Qaleh-ye Mirzai | Qaleh-ye Mirzai | Qaleh-ye Mohammad Ali | Qaleh-ye Molla Hoseyn Ali | Qaleh-ye Murd | Qaleh-ye Narenji | Qaleh-ye Now | Qaleh-ye Now-e Kavar | Qaleh-ye Now-e Mozaffari | Qaleh-ye Piru | Qaleh-ye Sartoli | Qaleh-ye Seyyed | Qaleh-ye Seyyed | Qaleh-ye Shahpur Khani | Qaleh-ye Tiskhani | Qaleyni | Qanamabad | Qanat Bagh | Qanat Ebrahim | Qanat Sorkh | Qanat | Qanat-e Malek | Qanat-e Now | Qanat-e Sur | Qanbari | Qandil | Qandilak | Qannat | Qarah Aqaj Sand Quarry | Qarah Darreh | Qarah Gozlu | Qarah Hoseyni | Qarah Kenar | Qarah Qayah | Qardashabad | Qareh Gol-e Olya | Qareh Gol-e Sofla | Qasemabad | Qasemabad | Qasemabad | Qasemabad | Qasemabad | Qasemabad-e Bikheh Deraz | Qasemabad-e Olya | Qasemabad-e Sarui | Qasemabad-e Sofla | Qashm Qavi | Qasr-e Ahmad | Qasr-e Ali | Qasr-e Asem | Qasr-e Jamal | Qasr-e Khalil | Qasr-e Molla | Qasr-e Qomsheh | Qasr-e Sasan | Qasr-e Yaqub | Qatar Aghaj | Qatar Boneh | Qatruyeh | Qavamabad | Qavamabad | Qavamabad-e Chichaklu | Qavamcheh | Qayqalu | Qaziabad | Qazian-e Olya | Qazian-e Sofla | Qerrekhlu | Qeshlaq | Qeshlaq | Qeshlaq-e Anjireh | Qezmazari | Qir | Qods Azad Cooperative | Qomabad | Qorban Lak | Qorbanabad | Qoroq-e Qavamcheh | Qosira | Qotbabad | Quch Khvos | Quri |

R
Rafiabad | Rah Shahi | Rahgan | Rahimabad | Rahimabad | Rahimabad | Rahimabad-e Kamin | Rahmatabad | Rahmatabad | Rahmatabad | Rahmatabad | Rahmatabad | Rahmatabad | Rahnuyeh | Rais Yahya | Rambeh | Ramjerd | Ramjerdi | Rashidabad | Rashidabad | Rashk-e Olya | Rashk-e Sofla | Rashmijan | Rashnabad | Razag | Razianeh Kari | Razmanjan | Rejaabad | Rejalu | Remijan | Reykan | Rezaabad Juchin | Rezaabad | Rezaabad | Richi | Rigan | Rijan | Rimur Elias | Rimur Sharif | Rizakan | Robat | Robatak | Rohani | Roknabad | Roknabad | Roknabad | Romeghan | Ronjeku | Rostamabad | Rostaq | Rotating Machine Company | Ru Darya | Rubahqan | Rud Rezak | Rud Shir-e Olya | Rud Shir-e Ziranbuh | Rudak | Rudaki | Rudbal | Rudbal | Rugir-e Hajji Mohammad Taqi | Rugir-e Hasani | Rugir-e Qaleh Hajji | Rugir-e Taj Amiri | Runiz | Runiz-e Sofla | Rustai-ye Shahid Bahonar | Rustai-ye Taleqani | Ruz Badan | Ruzian

S
Saadat Shahr | Saadatabad | Saadatabad | Saadatabad | Saadatabad | Saadatabad | Saadatabad | Saadatabad | Saadatabad | Saadatabad-e Molla Hoseyni | Saadatabad-e Olya | Saadatabad-e Sofla | Saadatabad-e Vasat | Saady Gardens and Farms | Sabakhi | Sabonah | Sabuk | Sabzabad | Sabzabad | Sabzuiyeh | Sabzuyeh | Sachun | Sadatabad | Sadatabad | Sadeh | Sadeqabad | Sadeqabad | Sadeqabad | Sadeqabad | Sadeqabad | Sadeqabad | Sadeqabad-e Lachari | Sadereh | Sadrabad | Sadrabad | Safar Beyk | Safarabad | Safashahr | Safiabad | Saghadeh | Saghuyeh | Sahlabad | Sahlabad | Sahlabad | Sahlabad | Sahlabad | Sahlabad-e Sorush | Sahra Sefid | Sahrarud | Sahray-e Bid | Sahray-e Bugal | Sahray-e Nimeh | Sahuk | Sakadeh | Sakhteman ol Khas | Sakhteman-e Baseri | Sakhteman-e Hajj Parviz | Sakhteman-e Hajji Soleyman | Sakhteman-e Kamar | Sakhteman-e Khunriz | Sakhteman-e Mansur | Sakhteman-e Qanbari | Sakhteman-e Rayisi | Sakhteman-e Shokarollah | Salamatabad | Salamatabad | Salari | Salbiz | Salehabad | Salehabad | Salehabad | Salmanabad | Salu | Samadabad | Samak | Samang | Samangan | Sang Kar | Sangar | Sangar | Sangar-e Olya | Sangar-e Sofla | Sangbor | Sang-e Charak | Sang-e Sefid | Sang-e Sefid | Sang-e Zur | Sanjanak | Saqqaabad | Saqqavan | Sar Ab-e Gojestan | Sar Asiab-e Bala | Sar Asiab-e Pain | Sar Bast | Sar Bast | Sar Bisheh | Sar Cheshmeh | Sar Dasht | Sar Gar | Sar Mala | Sar Mashhad | Sar Molki-ye Qanat-e Now | Sar Mur | Sar Qanat | Sar Rud | Sar Tang | Sar Tang-e Bala | Sar Tang-e Kuchak | Sar Taveh-ye Midjan | Sar Tol-e Dowlatabad | Sar Tom | Sarab Rud | Sarabad | Sarab-e Bahram | Sarab-e Siah | Saran-e Bala | Saran-e Pain | Sarbal | Sarchah | Sardab | Sardkhaneh-ye Baradaran Padram | Sar-e Sal | Sarenjelak | Sargah | Sarkerm | Sarqanat | Sartang-e Bozorg | Sarv Nokhvodi | Sarvak | Sarvandan | Sarvegar | Sarvestan | Sarvestan | Sarvu | Sarvuiyeh | Savar-e Gheyb | Sayeban | Sedeh | Sedeh | Sedeh | Seh Chah | Seh Chah | Seh Chah | Seh Chah | Seh Darreh | Seh Darreh | Seh Konj | Seh Talan | Seh Talan | Seh Tolan | Seh Tonbak | Sehqalat | Sehtolan | Semengi | Senan | Senjed Gol | Sepidan Flour Mill | Serizjan-e Namdi | Servan | Sevenj | Sevis | Seyfabad | Seyfabad | Seyfabad | Seyfabad | Seyl Band | Seyyed Abdollah | Seyyed Ahmadi | Seyyed Hashemi | Seyyed Hoseyn | Seyyed Hoseyn | Seyyed Mohammad | Seyyed Sharif Shahada | Seyyedabad | Seyyedan | Shabakeh-ye Bon Dasht | Shadkam | Shaghun | Shaghun | Shah Abu ol Fath | Shah Abu Zakaria | Shah Bahram | Shah Bahrami | Shah Galdi | Shah Gheyb | Shah Jahan Ahmad | Shah Marz | Shah Mohammadi | Shah Mohit | Shah Mowmen | Shah Nur ol Din | Shah Qotb ol Din | Shah Qotb ol Din Heydar | Shah Rostam | Shah Taslim-e Olya | Shahababad | Shahabi | Shahbaz Khani | Shah-e Shahidan | Shahi Jan | Shahid Matahari Training Academy | Shahid | Shahidabad | Shahnan | Shahpur Jan | Shahr Ashub | Shahr Meyan | Shahrak ol Mohammad | Shahrak-e Abraj | Shahrak-e Aliabad | Shahrak-e Ardkapan | Shahrak-e Bazargan | Shahrak-e Boneh Kolaghi | Shahrak-e Bostan | Shahrak-e Chah Tala | Shahrak-e Cham Kuku | Shahrak-e Dehnow | Shahrak-e Emam Khomeyni | Shahrak-e Emam Khomeyni | Shahrak-e Emam Sadeq | Shahrak-e Emam | Shahrak-e Emam | Shahrak-e Esteqlal | Shahrak-e Fajr | Shahrak-e Fath ol Mobin | Shahrak-e Gachgaran | Shahrak-e Ghadir | Shahrak-e Ghadir Navaygan | Shahrak-e Golestan | Shahrak-e Gudarz | Shahrak-e Hafez | Shahrak-e Hangam | Shahrak-e Igder | Shahrak-e Isar | Shahrak-e Isar | Shahrak-e Jadid Ardali | Shahrak-e Jahadabad | Shahrak-e Javad ol Aymeh | Shahrak-e Khalilabad | Shahrak-e Kola Siah | Shahrak-e Kondaz | Shahrak-e Mahdavi | Shahrak-e Mahdiyeh | Shahrak-e Makuyeh | Shahrak-e Malekabad | Shahrak-e Muk | Shahrak-e Qalat | Shahrak-e Qotlu | Shahrak-e Roknabad | Shahrak-e Sadara | Shahrak-e Sadra | Shahrak-e Safi Khani | Shahrak-e Sarollah | Shahrak-e Sayeban | Shahrak-e Seyyed Ala ol Din Hoseyn | Shahrak-e Seyyed ol Shohada | Shahrak-e Shahid Bahnar Jadval-e Now | Shahrak-e Shahid Beheshti | Shahrak-e Shahid Dastgheyb | Shahrak-e Shahid Motahhari | Shahrak-e Shahid Rajai | Shahrak-e Shahid Rejai | Shahrak-e Shohada Ashayir | Shahrak-e Shomali | Shahrak-e Taleqani | Shahrak-e Tang-e Hana | Shahrak-e Trafiki | Shahrak-e Vali-ye Asr | Shahrak-e Vali-ye Asr | Shahrak-e Vazireh | Shahrak-e Zanjiran | Shahr-e Khafr | Shahr-e Pir | Shahrenjan | Shahrestan | Shahrestan | Shahriar | Shahzadeh Abu ol Qasem | Shamlu | Shamsabad | Shamsabad | Shamsabad | Shamsabad | Shamsabad-e Borzu | Shamsabad-e Takht | Shamzagh | Sharafabad | Sharafuyeh | Shardeh | Sharqabad | Sharqi | Shastegan | Shatt-e Badam | Shehneh | Shekaft | Shenayez | Sherkat-e Gol Sorkh Meymand | Sherkat-e Pars Gostar | Sherkat-e Shang Shakan-e Rostaq | Shesh Pir | Sheshdeh | Shetvan | Shevergan | Shevid Zar | Sheydan | Sheydan | Sheydanak | Sheykh Abud | Sheykh Aib | Sheykh Amer | Sheykh Mohammad Rezayi | Sheykh Mohammad | Sheykhabad | Sheykhi Zirdu | Sheykhi | Shib Jadval | Shib Tang | Shir Baba | Shir Daneh | Shir Espari | Shir Habib | Shir Khvorosht | Shir Khvoshi-ye Sofla | Shir Mohammadi | Shiraz | Shiraz Industrial Estate | Shiraz Refinery | Shirbim | Shirganji | Shirin | Shirinu | Shirvani | Shokrabad | Sholdan | Showsani | Shul | Shul | Shul | Shulan | Shul-e Bozi | Shul-e Bozorg | Shul-e Sarui | Shur Ab | Shur Junegan | Shurab | Shurabad | Shurab-e Lor | Shurab-e Tork | Shurab-e Zar | Shurjeh | Shurjestan | Shuru Vazireh | Si La | Sibuiyeh | Sigar-e Bala | Simakan | Simiareh | Sir Banu | Sir Yazjan-e Galeh Zan Abu ol Hasan Beygi | Sir Yazjan-e Galeh Zan Mazarai | Sirati | Sirizjan | Sisakhti-ye Sofla | Sisnian | Sistan-e Olya | Sivand | Siyahun | Sobatu | Sofla | Soghad | Soghad | Solbuyeh | Soleymanabad | Soltanabad | Soltanabad | Soltanabad | Soltanabad | Soltanabad-e Koruni | Soltan-e Velayat | Somar Jan | Somghan | Sorkhabad | Sufian | Suleh Bedar | Sur-e Tahmasb | Surian | Surmaq

T
Tadavan | Tadna | Tafhian | Taft | Taghun | Tahrehdan | Tahuneh | Tahuneh | Tajabad | Tajabad | Takestan-e Sadrabad | Takhtabad | Takht-e Chaman | Takht-e Rud | Takhteh Sang-e Olya | Takhteh Sang-e Sofla | Takhteh | Tal-e Afghani | Tal-e Gar | Tal-e Khaki | Tal-e Sefid | Taleb Beygi | Taleqani | Talkh Ab | Talkh Ab | Talkh Ab-e Valad | Talkhab | Talkhab-e Olya | Talkhab-e Shahi Jan | Talkhab-e Sofla | Tall Anjir | Tall Anjir | Tall Bargah | Tall Beleki | Tall Boland | Tall Gord | Tall Heydari | Tall Kohneh | Tall Korehi-ye Bon Rud | Tall Koshi | Tall Kuhak | Tall Mahtabi | Tall Milak | Tall Nader | Tall Naqareh | Tall Naqareh | Tall Rizi-ye Alivand | Tall Roshtan | Tall Saman | Tall Sarbani | Tall Siah | Tall Soleymani | Tall Zard | Tall-e Abiz | Tall-e Beyza | Tall-e Bidkan | Tall-e Gachi | Tall-e Gav | Tall-e Kushk | Tall-e Mohammad Reza | Tall-e Mollai | Tall-e Rigi | Tall-e Sabz | Tall-e Sefid-e Sofla | Tall-e Shureh | Tall-e Sorkh | Tammaru | Tang Ab | Tang Koreh | Tang Mohr | Tang Qir | Tang Sa | Tang-e Anari | Tang-e Badi-ye Bala | Tang-e Baha ol Dini | Tang-e Boraq | Tang-e Cheh Zarreh | Tang-e Chowgan-e Olya | Tang-e Chowgan-e Olya-ye Kashkuli | Tang-e Chowgan-e Sofla | Tang-e Chowgan-e Sofla-ye Dar Shuri | Tang-e Chowgan-e Vosta | Tang-e Chuk | Tang-e Dehuiyeh | Tang-e Gav | Tang-e Gojestan | Tang-e Kabutari | Tang-e Karam | Tang-e Katuiyeh | Tang-e Khiareh | Tang-e Kish | Tang-e Koleh | Tang-e Kur | Tang-e Mohammad Saleh | Tang-e Monareh | Tang-e Qalangi | Tang-e Riz | Tang-e Rudian | Tang-e Ruin | Tang-e Shur-e Olya | Tang-e Si | Tang-e Tagher | Tang-e Tur | Tang-e Zard | Tangeh Narreh | Tanguyeh-ye Olya | Tanguyeh-ye Sofla | Taq Taq | Taqiabad | Tarab Khani | Tarbor-e Jafari | Tarbor-e Lay Bisheh | Tarbor-e Sadat | Tarman | Tarqideh | Tarreh Dan | Tasak | Tashk | Tashuyeh | Tasuj | Tavakkolabad | Tavakkolabad-e Markazi | Taveh Dashqoli | Taveh Fashang | Tayifeh Michak | Tehrani | Tiab | Tir Afjan | Tirazjan | Tireh Bagh | Tisheh Gari | Titevand | Tizab | Tizabad | Tizdang-e Olya | Tol Polui | Tol Rigi | Tol Zari | Tol-e Bondu | Tol-e Gavmishi | Tol-e Geli | Tol-e Gor-e Hajjiabad | Tol-e Heydari | Tol-e Khandaq-e Olya | Tol-e Khandaq-e Sofla | Tol-e Meshkin | Tol-e Noqareh | Tol-e Pir | Tol-e Semengi | Tol-e Zireh | Toll-e Mallu | Tolombeh Amiq-e Shomareh-ye Yek | Tolombeh Hay-e Eslamabad-e Yek | Tolombeh Hay-e Malusjan | Tolombeh-ye Abbasabad | Tolombeh-ye Abdol Rahim Ravan | Tolombeh-ye Abiyari Zahd Shahr-e Do | Tolombeh-ye Abiyari Zahd Shahr-e Yek | Tolombeh-ye Afrasiyab Babayi | Tolombeh-ye Afshar | Tolombeh-ye Akbar Sadeqi | Tolombeh-ye Akbar Shams | Tolombeh-ye Akhan | Tolombeh-ye Ali Naz Khosrowi | Tolombeh-ye Ali Reza Yarahmadi | Tolombeh-ye Allah Verdi Mohammadi | Tolombeh-ye Amidvar | Tolombeh-ye Aqa Gol | Tolombeh-ye Aqa Mohammad | Tolombeh-ye Arj Yarahmadi | Tolombeh-ye Asghar-e Taqizadeh | Tolombeh-ye Azami | Tolombeh-ye Aziz Ali Nezhadi | Tolombeh-ye Bahram Keyani | Tolombeh-ye Baqeri | Tolombeh-ye Baqeri | Tolombeh-ye Bar Aftab Shirdani | Tolombeh-ye Barani | Tolombeh-ye Basijian | Tolombeh-ye Baziar | Tolombeh-ye Beglar Yarahmadi | Tolombeh-ye Darab-e Posht Kuhi | Tolombeh-ye Emamqoli Khalaj | Tolombeh-ye Fereydun | Tolombeh-ye Gharib Yarahmadi | Tolombeh-ye Gholam Hoseyn Bizheni | Tolombeh-ye Hamzeh Fakhrai | Tolombeh-ye Hasan Ebrahimi | Tolombeh-ye Hasanabad | Tolombeh-ye Hashem Sheybani | Tolombeh-ye Hay Abguiyeh | Tolombeh-ye Haykatabad | Tolombeh-ye Hoseyn Yarahmadi | Tolombeh-ye Iraj Keyani | Tolombeh-ye Jamal Mohammady | Tolombeh-ye Kamali | Tolombeh-ye Karim Yarahmadi | Tolombeh-ye Kazemi | Tolombeh-ye Khosrowi | Tolombeh-ye Kordshuli | Tolombeh-ye Kushesh | Tolombeh-ye Lay Qamand | Tolombeh-ye Masum Hoseyni | Tolombeh-ye Mehdi Qoli Key Manesh | Tolombeh-ye Mohammad Ali Ghiasi | Tolombeh-ye Mohammad Hasan Kashafi | Tolombeh-ye Mohammad Hoseyn Jafari | Tolombeh-ye Mohammad Morad Heydary | Tolombeh-ye Mohandas Liaqat | Tolombeh-ye Morteza Khan | Tolombeh-ye Nad Ali Beygi | Tolombeh-ye Nazeri | Tolombeh-ye Nezam Taheri | Tolombeh-ye Qanbar Ali Ashraf | Tolombeh-ye Rostam | Tolombeh-ye Sadeqi | Tolombeh-ye Salaki | Tolombeh-ye Samad Aqa | Tolombeh-ye Samadabad | Tolombeh-ye Seyyedeh | Tolombeh-ye Seyyedi Khan Saidi | Tolombeh-ye Shahid Mahmud Owtrab | Tolombeh-ye Sharafuiyeh | Tolombeh-ye Siah Chehareh va Shorka | Tolombeh-ye Tahmasb | Tolombeh-ye Yadollah Khalaj | Tolombeh-ye Zahedi | Tom Shuli | Toremeh | Torkan | Training Centre | Tugah-e Qarah Bas | Tujerdi |

V
Vahdatabad | Vakilabad | Vakilabad | Vakilabad | Valiabad | Valiabad | Valiabad | Valiasr | Validabad | Varak | Varavi | Vardavan | Vaselabad | Vazak-e Moradi | Vazirabad | Vazireh | Vizaran | Vocational Training Centre

W
Water Distribution Company

Y
Yaghleh Mazeh | Yahyaabad | Yahyaabad | Yanderanlu | Yaqubabad | Yarj | Yas Chaman | Yaseriyeh | Yek Dangeh | Yitimu | Yord-e Anjir | Yord-e Jamal | Yurd Dasht-e Zalzaleh | Yurdhai-ye Abdol Yusefi | Yurdhai-ye Miraki | Yusefabad | Yusefabad | Yuzdan

Z
Zafarabad | Zagh | Zahed Mahmud | Zahedshahr | Zakharu-e Bala | Zakherd | Zakian | Zalemi | Zameni | Zanganeh | Zangeneh | Zangeneh-ye Bon Rud | Zangiabad | Zanguiyeh | Zanguyeh | Zar Qalat | Zarak-e Tang Khas | Zarareh | Zarat | Zaravan | Zargaran | Zarjan | Zarqan | Zarqanak | Zarrin Kuyeh | Zarrinabad-e Darreh Shuri | Zaval | Zavali | Zazeh | Zeyn ol Din | Zeyn ol Dini | Zeynabad | Zeynabad | Zeynabad-e Hangam | Zeynabad-e Sangi | Zeynabad-e Zakhru | Zeynalabad | Zeytun | Zeytun | Ziadabad | Ziadabad | Ziadabad | Zighan | Zijerd | Ziqan | Zir Anay-e Olya | Zir Anay-e Sofla | Zir Zard-e Alishahi | Zirab | Zirgar | Zirgar-e Owl Luyi | Zohrababad

Administratively
Abadeh County
Arsanjan County
Bavanat County
Darab County
Eqlid County
Estahban County
Farashband County
Fasa County
Firuzabad County
Gerash County
Jahrom County
Kavar County
Kazerun County
Kharameh County
Khonj County
Khorrambid County
Lamerd County
Larestan County
Mamasani County
Marvdasht County
Mohr County
Neyriz County
Pasargad County
Qir and Karzin County
Rostam County
Sarvestan County
Sepidan County
Shiraz County
Zarrin Dasht County

References

 
Fars Province